The tectofilosids are a group of filose amoebae with shells.  These are composed of organic materials and sometimes collected debris, in contrast to the euglyphids, which produce shells from siliceous scales.  The shell usually has a single opening, but in Amphitrema and a few other genera it has two on opposite ends.  The cell itself occupies most of the shell.  They are most often found on marsh plants such as Sphagnum.

This group was previously classified as the Gromiida or Gromiina.  However, molecular studies separate Gromia from the others, which must therefore be renamed. They are placed among the Cercozoa, and presumably developed from flagellates like Cryothecomonas, which has a similar test. However, only a few have been studied in detail, so their relationships and monophyly are not yet certain.

In a recent classification, the group Tectofilosida was not used: Chlamydophryidae, Psammonobiotidae, Pseudodifflugiidae and Volutellidae were dispersally placed in Thecofilosea, while Amphitremidae was included in Labyrinthulomycetes.

Taxonomy
 Order Tectofilosida Cavalier-Smith & Chao 2003 (paraphyletic)
 Suborder Lithocollina Cavalier-Smith 2012
 Family Lithocollidae Schulze 1874
 Suborder Unitremina Cavalier-Smith 2012
 Family Rhizaspididae Howe et al. 2011 [Rhizaspidaceae Skuja 1948]
 Family Fiscullidae Dumack et al. 2017
 Family Pseudodifflugiidae De Saedeleer 1934
 Family Psammonobiotidae Golemansky 1974 emend Meisterfeld 2002
 Family Chlamydophryidae de Saedeleer 1934 emend. Meisterfeld 2002
 Family Volutellidae Sudzuki 1979

References

Filosa
Amoeboids